The Mustard procedure was developed in 1963 by Dr. William Mustard at the Hospital for Sick Children in Toronto, Ontario, Canada.

Dr. Mustard, with support from the Heart and Stroke Foundation of Canada, developed an alternative and simplified technique to the Senning procedure which was used to correct a congenital heart defect that produced “blue babies”. The technique was adopted by other surgeons and became the standard operation for d-TGA.

In his autobiography, South African cardiac surgeon Christiaan Barnard claims to have been the first to perform the operation, with Mustard only following 'several years later'.

Background 
The defect is called transposition of the great vessels, or transposition of the great arteries (TGV or TGA). Until the late 1950s, and Senning's operation, the condition was commonly fatal.  The defect causes blood from the lungs to flow back to the lungs and blood from the body to flow back to the body. This occurs because the aorta and the pulmonary artery, the two major arteries coming out of the heart, are connected to the wrong chambers.  The babies look blue because there is insufficient oxygen circulating in their bodies.

Procedure 
The Mustard Procedure allows total correction of transposition of the great vessels. The procedure employs a baffle to redirect caval blood flow to the left atrium which then pumps blood to the left ventricle which then pumps the deoxygenated blood to the lungs.
In a normal heart, de-oxygenated blood is pumped into the lungs via the right ventricle. Then it is distributed throughout the body via the left ventricle. In the Mustard procedure, blood is pumped to the lungs via the left ventricle and disseminated throughout the body via the right ventricle.

Superseded by Arterial Switch
The Mustard procedure was largely replaced in the late 1980s by the Jatene procedure (arterial switch), in which the native arteries were switched back to normal flow, so that the RV (right ventricle) would be connected to the pulmonary artery and the LV (left ventricle) would be connected to the aorta.  This surgery had not been possible prior to 1975 because of difficulty with re-implanting coronary arteries which perfuse the actual heart muscle itself (myocardium), and even after it was first performed the excellent results from the Mustard operation meant that it was a long time before the Jatene procedure took over.

Long-term survival
The Mustard procedure improved an 80% mortality rate in the first year of life to an 80% survival at age 20. Long-term follow-up studies now extend to more than 40 years post-operation and there are numerous patients thriving in their 50s. A Facebook group, Mustard or Senning Survivors, gathers several hundred global survivors in their 20s to 50s into a single community, supporting adults born with TGA that have had a Mustard, Senning, Rastelli or Nikaidoh heart procedure.

See also
 Congenital heart disease
 Blalock–Hanlon procedure

References

Cardiac surgery